In cookery, a cook's treat is a portion of the prepared ingredients not served as part of a dish, but which is nevertheless tasty and enjoyable and may be eaten by the cook. Examples might include a chocolate brownie that is cosmetically disfigured but otherwise edible, or unused portions of cookie dough. Related to the idea of perks and fringe benefits.

See also

External links
Busy Cooks - About.com article

Cooking